Taraza may refer to:

Tarazá - a municipality in Antioquia Department, Colombia.
Tarazá River a river in Antioquia, Colombia
Taraza (Dune) - a fictional character in the Dune series of novels by Frank Herbert.